Harrison McGahey (born 26 September 1995) is an English professional footballer who plays as a defender for Oldham Athletic. McGahey began his career as a junior with Blackburn Rovers and then Liverpool, before moving to Blackpool where he eventually made his first team debut.

Career

Blackpool
McGahey joined Blackpool aged 14 after spells in the youth teams of Blackburn Rovers and Liverpool. After helping the Blackpool youth side win the junior league title, McGahey signed a professional contract with the club. He then made his professional league début for Blackpool on 18 April 2014 in a 1–0 home defeat against Burnley. McGahey's deal was only a short-term one and after three first-team appearances he elected not to renew terms with the club.

Sheffield United
McGahey signed a two-year contract, with an option for a third, for Sheffield United for an undisclosed fee on 18 July 2014. Despite McGahey being out of contract, his age meant that Blackpool were due a fee and as such the two clubs agreed a compensation package.

McGahey joined Tranmere Rovers on loan until the end of the 2014–15 season on 13 February 2015. He was recalled one month later.

Rochdale
On 16 June 2016 McGahey joined Rochdale on a two-year deal.

He was offered a new contract by Rochdale at the end of the 2017–18 season.

Scunthorpe United
On 4 January 2019, McGahey signed for Scunthorpe United for an undisclosed fee on a two-and-a-half-year deal. He was one of 17 players released by Scunthorpe at the end of the 2020–21 season.

Oldham Athletic
After being released by Scunthorpe McGahey signed to Oldham Athletic in June 2021.

Career statistics

Club

References

External links

1995 births
Living people
English footballers
Blackburn Rovers F.C. players
Liverpool F.C. players
Blackpool F.C. players
Sheffield United F.C. players
Tranmere Rovers F.C. players
Rochdale A.F.C. players
Scunthorpe United F.C. players
Oldham Athletic A.F.C. players
Association football defenders
English Football League players
Footballers from Preston, Lancashire